Mullaghmore may refer to the following places in Ireland:

General
 Mullaghmore, County Clare, a limestone hill
 Mullaghmore Peninsula, a peninsula in County Sligo
 Mullaghmore, County Sligo, a village on the Mullaghmore Peninsula
 Mullaghmore, County Londonderry, a hill in the Sperrin Mountains near Draperstown 
 Mullaghmore, Tullyhunco, a townland
 Mullaghmore, Templeport, a townland

Townlands in the Republic of Ireland
 List of townlands in County Cavan (4 townlands called "Mullaghmore", in the baronies of Tullyhunco, Tullyhaw, and Castlerahan (2) )
 List of townlands of the barony of West Carbery (W.D.) in County Cork
 List of townlands in County Galway (4 townlands called "Mullaghmore North", "Mullaghmore South",  "Mullaghmore East", and "Mullaghmore West")
 List of townlands in County Laois
 List of townlands in County Leitrim (2 townlands called "Mullaghmore")
 List of townlands in County Meath (1 townland called "Mullaghmore" and one called "Allerstown" or "Mullaghmore")
 List of townlands in County Monaghan (3 townlands called "Mullaghmore", in the baronies of Trough, Dartree, and Monaghan; and 3 townlands called "Mullaghmore North", "Mullaghmore East", and "Mullaghmore West")
 List of townlands in County Roscommon

Townlands in Northern Ireland
 List of townlands in County Armagh
 Mullaghmore, County Down, a townland in County Down
 List of townlands in County Fermanagh
 List of townlands in County Londonderry (1 townland called "Mullaghmore" and one called "Mullaghmore Glebe")
 List of townlands in County Tyrone (6 townlands called "Mullaghmore", in the baronies of Omagh East (2), Strabane Upper, Dungannon Middle, and Clogher (2); and 3 townlands called "Mullaghmore Glebe", "Mullaghmore East", and "Mullaghmore West")